South Korea, as Korea, competed at the 1956 Summer Olympics in Melbourne, Australia. 35 competitors, all men, took part in 23 events in 7 sports.

Medalists

Athletics

Track and road

Field

Basketball

Group round

 China 83-76 Korea
 Bulgaria 89-58 Korea
 Uruguay 83-60 Korea

Classification 9-15

Group 2 (9-15)

 Canada 74-63 Korea
 Japan 83-67 Korea

Classification 13-15
Thailand's loss gave the nation 15th place.

 Korea 61-47 Thailand
 Singapore, BYE

Classification 13/14
 Singapore 92-79 Korea

Korea's final ranking was 14th.

Squad
An Yeong-sik, An Byeong-seok, Jo Byeong-hyeon, Choi Tae-gon, Kim Chun-bae, Kim Hyeong-il, Kim Yeong-gi, Kim Yeong-su, Go Se-tae, Baek Jeong-nam

Boxing

Cycling

Road competition

Shooting

Two shooters represented South Korea in 1956.
Men

Weightlifting

Men

Wrestling

Men's Freestyle

References

External links
Official Olympic Reports
International Olympic Committee results database

Korea, South
1956
1956 in South Korean sport